The 2017 China Championship (officially the 2017 Evergrande China Championship) was a professional ranking snooker tournament that took place between 16 and 22 August 2017 in China. It was the second ranking event of the 2017/2018 season.

This was the first time the event was a ranking tournament. John Higgins was the defending champion, but was knocked out in the second round by Tom Ford.

Luca Brecel won his first ranking tournament, beating Shaun Murphy 10–5 in the final. He became the first player from mainland Europe to win a ranking event.

Prize fund
The breakdown of prize money for this year is shown below:

 Winner: £150,000
 Runner-up: £75,000
 Semi-final: £32,000
 Quarter-final: £18,000
 Last 16: £12,000
 Last 32: £7,000
 Last 64: £4,000

 Televised highest break: £3,000
 Total: £700,000

The "rolling 147 prize" for a maximum break stood at £15,000

Main draw

Notes

Final

Qualifying
These matches were held between 3 and 6 June 2017 at the Preston Guild Hall in Preston, England. All matches were the best of 9 frames.

Notes

Century breaks

Qualifying stage centuries

Total: 29

 138  Zhang Anda
 136  Stuart Carrington
 134, 124  Marco Fu
 120  David Gilbert
 115  Mark Allen
 115  Rhys Clark
 111  Anthony McGill
 110  Chris Wakelin
 110  Mark Williams
 109  Shaun Murphy
 107  Anthony Hamilton
 105  Joe Perry
 104  Barry Hawkins
 104  Xiao Guodong

 103  Ali Carter
 103  Jimmy Robertson
 103  Chen Zifan
 102  Mark Davis
 102  Ken Doherty
 102  Sam Craigie
 101  Peter Ebdon
 101  Stephen Maguire
 100  Judd Trump
 100  Ian Preece
 100  Gerard Greene
 100  Thepchaiya Un-Nooh
 100  Hossein Vafaei
 100  Chris Totten

Televised stage centuries
Total: 40

 144  Thepchaiya Un-Nooh
 139, 133, 103  Li Hang
 139, 130, 124, 100  Ronnie O'Sullivan
 137  Ryan Day
 134  Mark Joyce
 133, 127, 112  Ali Carter
 133  Tom Ford
 130, 120  Stuart Carrington
 129, 119  John Higgins
 128, 105, 104  Judd Trump
 128  Ding Junhui
 124, 104  Zhou Yuelong

 124  Fergal O'Brien
 123  Mark Selby
 122  Yan Bingtao
 115  Mark Williams
 110, 107, 103  Luca Brecel
 110  Barry Hawkins
 109  Mark Davis
 107, 104, 100  Shaun Murphy
 104  Michael White
 102  Marco Fu
 102  Liang Wenbo
 100  Alfie Burden

References

China Championship (snooker)
China Championship (snooker)
China Championship (snooker)
China Championship (snooker)